Lower Merion High School is a public high school in Ardmore, Pennsylvania in the Main Line suburbs of Philadelphia. It is one of two high schools in the Lower Merion School District; the other one is Harriton High School. Lower Merion serves both Lower Merion Township and the Borough of Narberth.

In 2020, Niche.com ranked Lower Merion High School ranked sixth among college preparatory public high schools in Pennsylvania and U.S. News & World Report ranked Harriton High School and Lower Merion High School 13th and 14th in the state respectively. The school mascot is a bulldog, and its athletics teams are known as the "Aces”, honoring the U.S. Air Force Flying Aces established by Lower Merion alumnus Henry H. Arnold, an American general in both the U.S. Army and Air Force.

History

19th century

In 1894, with the consolidation of the area's three village high schools (Merion Square, Bryn Mawr, and Ardmore), Lower Merion began its first year in a stone building shared with the Ardmore Avenue Elementary School in Ardmore. In 1897, nine students participated in the school's first commencement ceremony. The original high school faculty had seven members, including the principal and superintendent. The curriculum offered only a two-year preparation for either college or industry.

20th century
The Ardmore Avenue School burned in 1900 but was rebuilt, also of stone. In 1911, the high school moved out of the elementary school to new quarters, designed and constructed at the present site, 245 E. Montgomery Avenue. Dedicated on December 2, 1911, Lower Merion Senior High School was an impressive granite and stone edifice considered one of the finest new educational facilities in the state. At its opening, twenty-one staff members were employed under principal "Professor" Charles B. Pennypacker.

In 1922, Lower Merion Junior High School, later renamed Ardmore Junior High School, was constructed adjacent to the senior high school, and in 1926 two new wings were added on either side of the main high school building. These additions doubled the size of the original school, helping to accommodate rapidly increasing enrollment. The present administration building was constructed in 1932 to provide office space and an additional twenty-five classrooms. By 1940, the teaching staff had expanded to 61 under the direction of principal George H. Gilbert. Total student enrollment was 1461 for grades 10–12.

In 1943, an adjoining technical building was added along the School House Lane side to house shops for auto repair, metal, print, wood-working and drafting. In 1950, a cafeteria/library wing, designed by the Philadelphia firm of Savory, Scheetz and Gilmour, was added near Pennypacker athletic field. That same year the  General Henry Harley "Hap" Arnold athletic fields opened directly across Montgomery Ave. By 1957, enrollment had grown to 1,663 students and the time had come to build a second high school (Harriton) in Lower Merion Township. The original 1910 building was demolished in 1963 and replaced by an air-conditioned classroom structure designed by H. A. Kuljian and Co.

Decreases in enrollment district-wide caused many Lower Merion elementary schools to close in the late 1970s along with Ardmore Junior High School. This move changed the remaining junior high schools to becoming middle schools (grades 6–8) and moved the ninth grade to the high schools. The Lower Merion High School graduation class of 1982 was the first freshman class at the high school including those students who four years earlier were members of the last graduating class of Ardmore Junior High School.

Due to later enrollment increases and to accommodate changing program needs, the district frequently reconfigured spaces in the facility, including re-opening classroom and storage space in the former Ardmore Junior High School in the 1990s. (Most of the junior high school had been demolished in 1992 to make way for additional parking). Rooms in the technical building were converted to other uses, including art classes, computer labs, and the school's television studio. Original classrooms were repurposed as spaces for individualized learning support and students with special needs.

21st century
In 2004, the central lobby that connected the 1932 and 1963 structures was converted to a college-style help center.

Also in 2004, a community advisory committee determined that existing facilities no longer met the standards of the Lower Merion community and recommended that a new school, configured for 21st century education, be constructed on the same site. The Board and administration authorized construction of this new school in 2007. Demolition of the "Ardmore Annex", the natatorium, and one of the school's two gyms commenced in the summer of 2008 to make way for construction. The new Lower Merion High School opened in September 2010 and was dedicated in a public ceremony on October 17, 2010. In addition to state-of-the-art classrooms, science laboratories, art classrooms, and music rehearsal spaces, the new Lower Merion features a lecture hall with tiered seating, a multi-purpose black box theater, an 850-seat auditorium/theater, a greenhouse for environmental and horticultural studies, high-performance athletic facilities, a swimming pool, a television studio, multi-media production facilities, a music technology lab, an expansive courtyard, and a two-story, glass-encased library that serves as the building's exterior focal point along Montgomery Avenue.

The school also features a planetarium on top of the old building that closed after it was declared a fire hazard. It was then temporarily transformed into a staff lounge room. However, the room is currently vacated.

The new school was constructed adjacent to the historic district administration office (DAO) building, which is the only original structure that remains on the site. A number of measures were approved by the Lower Merion Historic Commission to ensure the school was designed to complement this Class I historic resource. The placement of the new building provides an unobstructed view of the DAO from Montgomery Avenue. The color and size of the masonry used in the new building is reflective of materials of the DAO.

On November 13, 2021, the school principal, Sean Hughes, was killed in a car crash while driving his teenage son to a soccer game.

Athletics
Lower Merion Athletics compete in the Central League. The league expanded in 2008 to include the schools Harriton and Garnet Valley for a total of 12 schools. and are represented as either the Bulldogs or the Aces. Bulldogs is used for football, girls ice hockey, and softball. Aces is used by all other sports. Fall sports include cheerleading, cross country, field hockey, football, golf, soccer, tennis, volleyball, and water polo. Winter sports include basketball, ice hockey, indoor track, squash, swimming, and wrestling. Spring sports include baseball, crew, lacrosse, softball, tennis, track and field, ultimate frisbee, and volleyball.

Varsity baseball

The 2007 Lower Merion Baseball team recorded a 12–6 record, the second best in 50 years. They have only won one Central League Championship, in 2005.

Varsity basketball
The Lower Merion High School basketball team has won seven Pennsylvania Interscholastic Athletic Association State Championships. In 1930, 1931, and 1939 Lower Merion lost the AAA championship games (then the highest level of competition). They won the AAA championship in 1933, 1941, 1942, and 1943. The Aces won the AAAA championship in 1996, 2006, and 2013; they were AAAA runners-up in 2005 and 2012. Their most recent championship came in 2013 under Head Coach Gregg Downer (1990–).

In 1996, the Aces rode a 30-game winning streak to a district title and their first state title in 50 years, finishing the season 31–3.

Former NBA player Kobe Bryant led Lower Merion to the state championship before graduating in 1996. On December 16, 2010, the school held a sold-out dedication ceremony for Kobe Bryant, naming the school's new gym after him. In 2020, the Kobe Bryant Gymnasium hosted a memorial service honoring Bryant, after he was killed in a helicopter crash. His Lower Merion jersey (No. 33) was dedicated and now hangs over the door in the gym.

In the 2004–05 season, the Aces won the Western bracket and became the lowest seed to ever reach the state finals. In 2006, Lower Merion avenged three previous losses against the Chester Clippers in a rematch at the Palestra and defeated the heavily favored Schenley High School Spartans, 60–58, in the championship game.

In 2007, despite having lost six seniors, the Aces advanced to the AAAA Quarterfinals, losing to Simon Gratz High School.

In 2013, the Aces won the 2013 PIAA State title.

The following year, despite having lost ten seniors after the previous season, the Aces once again reached the AAAA Quarterfinals, where they were defeated by La Salle College High School.

Varsity tennis
The Varsity Boys' Tennis team won total of 10 PIAA AAA (3A is the highest level of competition for tennis in PA) state titles for Lower Merion high school. The Aces won the state team gold in 2006, 2007, 2015, 2016, 2017, and 2021, and finished second in 2008. Individually, the Aces won the PIAA AAA state boys' singles title in 2003 and 2021, while winning the state boys' doubles title in 2009 and 2021. The boys' 2021 tennis team is the first in Pennsylvania high school tennis history to capture the triple crown by winning the team title, singles title, and doubles title.

The varsity girls' tennis team captured the PIAA AAA state title in 2005, while finishing as finalist from 2000 to 2004. The girls' team won Central League and District 1 titles from 2000 to 2005.

Boys' varsity lacrosse
The Lower Merion boys' varsity Lacrosse team has won seven PIAA and or Pennsylvania Scholastic State Championships, (1966, 1967, 1969, 1977, 1979, 1984, 1999) the most of any high school in the Commonwealth, came in second three times (1970, 1978, and 1980) and have had 21 players be named All-American.

Laptop controversy

In the 2010 WebcamGate lawsuit, plaintiffs charged that Lower Merion School District (including Lower Merion High School and Harriton High School) secretly spied on students enrolled at the two high schools by surreptitiously and remotely activating webcams embedded in school-issued laptops the students were using at home, and therefore infringed on their privacy rights.  The schools admitted to secretly snapping over 66,000 webshots and screenshots. Those included webcam shots of students in their bedrooms.  In October 2010, the school district agreed to pay $610,000 to settle the Robbins and parallel Hasan lawsuits against it.

Two parents filed the lawsuit against the school district on February 11, 2010.  The plaintiff was a student at one of the two district high schools.  A federal judge issued a preliminary injunction ordering the district to stop its secret webcam monitoring, and ordered the district to pay the plaintiffs' attorney fees.

In July 2010, a Lower Merion High School student filed a parallel second suit.  The school was also put on notice of a third parallel suit that a third student intended to bring, for "improper surveillance of the Lower Merion High School student on his school issued laptop", which included taking over 700 webcam shots and screenshots between December 2009 and February 2010.

A U.S. Senate Judiciary subcommittee held hearings on the issues raised by the schools' secret surveillance, and Senator Arlen Specter introduced draft legislation in the Senate to protect against it in the future.  The Federal Bureau of Investigation (FBI), U.S. Attorney's Office, and Montgomery County School District attorney all initiated criminal investigations of the matter, which they combined and then closed because they did not find evidence "that would establish beyond a reasonable doubt that anyone involved had criminal intent". The civil lawsuit has a much lower burden of proof, and is unaffected by the decision. Lower Merion Police Superintendent Michael McGrath said: "This would appear to be a matter to be resolved in civil court."  An investigative report prepared by the law firm Ballard Spahr–the firm that the Lower Merion School District had hired to defend it–did not find evidence that the system "was used to 'spy' on students", but was unable in many instances to find who had authorized that the system take surreptitious photographs, for what reason, and to find copies of photographs that had been deleted from the school server.

Notable alumni

Graduation year in parentheses.

 JD Albert (1993), inventor and founder of E Ink
 Richard Amsel (1965) artist
 Amy Aquino (1975), film and television actress
 Henry H. Arnold (1903), general of the army and father of the U.S. Air Force The only person to become a five-star general of two military branches (Army and Air Force), was also the founder of Project RAND, which evolved into one of the world's largest non-profit global policy think tanks, the RAND Corporation, and one of the founders of Pan American World Airways
 Billy Aronson (1975), playwright, author, and originator of musical Rent
 Chuck Barris (1947), writer/producer, host of The Gong Show
 Julius W. Becton, Jr. (1944), Army general, director of Federal Emergency Management Agency (FEMA)
 Howard Benson (1974), Grammy-nominated music producer
 James H. Billington (1946), Librarian of Congress
 Al Bonniwell (1930), professional basketball player
 Jim Brogan (1976), NBA professional basketball player
 Kobe Bryant (1996), Naismith Memorial Basketball Hall of Fame player
 Russell Carter (1980), All American at Southern Methodist University (1984), NFL professional football player for New York Jets
 Lizzy McAlpine (2018), singer/songwriter featured on NPR's All Songs Considered 
 Johnny Christmas (2001), three-time high school All-American lacrosse player
 Joe Conwell (1979), USFL and NFL professional football player
 Tommy Conwell (1980), guitarist and lead singer for Tommy Conwell and the Young Rumblers
 Robert Fagles (1951), professor, poet best known for translating ancient Greek classics
 Bobbito Garcia (1984), DJ, writer
 Dylan Gelula (2012), actress
 Mark Gerban (1998), first person to represent Palestine at World Championships (2005–2007) in sport of rowing
 Gideon Glick (2006), Broadway performer
 Frederick Grinnell (biologist) (1962), cell biologist, bio-ethicist,
 Alexander Haig (1942), United States Army general, 1973–74 White House Chief of Staff and 1981–82 Secretary of State
 Marshall Herskovitz (1969), television writer and screenwriter
 B.J. Johnson (2013), NBA basketball player
 Scott Barry Kaufman (1998), psychologist, NYU professor, popular science writer
 Emily Kramer-Golinkoff (2003) founder of Emily's Entourage, a nonprofit organization dedicated to finding a cure for cystic fibrosis
 Howard Lassoff (1955–2013), American-Israeli basketball player
 Noyes Leech (1939), 1921–2010, University of Pennsylvania College Class of 1943 (BA), and  University of Pennsylvania Law School Class of 1948; served as editor-in-chief of the University of Pennsylvania Law Review; reestablished the Mitchell Club as a diverse group of fellow legal students; Ferdinand Wakeman Hubbell Professor of Law and the William A. Schnader Professor of Law at the University of Pennsylvania Law School
 Gerald M. Levin (1956), former chairman and CEO of Time Warner
 Rachel Levin (2014), YouTuber and beauty guru "RCLBeauty101"
 Aron Magner (1994), keyboard player for Disco Biscuits
 Nancy Meyers (1967), Hollywood writer/director/producer,
 J. Russell Peltz, Hall of Fame boxing promoter
 Bernard Pierce (did not graduate, transferred), NFL professional football player
 Samuel Proof (1992), actor
 Jon Rubin (1981), artist and professor
 Alec Scheiner (1988), president, Cleveland Browns of National Football League
 Lisa Scottoline (1973), attorney and noted bestselling author of legal thriller novels
 Lynn Sherr (1959), ABC News correspondent
 Neil Shubin (1978), Paleontologist and author
 Theodore Slaman (1972) mathematician, professor at University of California, Berkeley
 Matt Snider (1994), NFL professional football player
 Jan Peter Toennies (1948), physicist, former director of Max Planck Institute for Dynamics and Self-Organization
 Ilya Zhitomirskiy (2007), founder of Diaspora software and website

References

External links

 
 Lower Merion Alumni Site

1894 establishments in Pennsylvania
Educational institutions established in 1894
Lower Merion Township, Pennsylvania
Public high schools in Pennsylvania
Schools in Montgomery County, Pennsylvania